Vernal Charles (20 July 1985 – 7 April 2013) was a South African cricketer. He played four first-class matches for Eastern Province between 2011 and 2012. He was killed in a road accident in Port Elizabeth.

References

External links
 

1985 births
2013 deaths
South African cricketers
Eastern Province cricketers
Cricketers from Port Elizabeth
Road incident deaths in South Africa